Kazim Uddin Ahmed, also known as Dhanu, is a Bangladesh Awami League politician and the incumbent Member of Parliament of Mymensingh-11.

Birth and education 
Kazim Uddin Ahmed was born in Mymensingh District Bhaluka Upazila Mallikbari Union.

Career
From 2009 to 2014, Ahmed served as the Chairman of Bhaluka Upazila. Ahmed was elected to parliament from Mymensingh-11 as a Bangladesh Awami League candidate 30 December 2018.

References

Awami League politicians
Living people
11th Jatiya Sangsad members
People from Bhaluka Upazila
1966 births